Tessaropa guanabarina is a species of beetle in the family Cerambycidae. It was described by Martins in 1981.

References

Methiini
Beetles described in 1981